Vickie Gest is a documentary and drama producer from Brisbane (Queensland, Australia).

Professional career

Gest studied at the Queensland School of Film and Television, graduating with a Diploma in Film and Television in 1997.   Since then, Gest's short films and documentaries have screened at various film festivals, both locally and internationally, and on television in Australia on ABC1 and SBS.  Gest currently works as an independent producer and is the co-managing director of Vizpoets Entertainment with Lauren Ford.

Selected filmography

Features

"Two Heads Creek" (2019) - Co Producer
"The Oppression" (in development) - Producer
"The Forestkind” (in development) - Producer
"What if?" (in development) – Producer

TV Series

The Broken Ones (in development) - Producer

 Documentary

"Over My Dead Body" (2007) – Producer
"Roller Derby Dolls" (2008) – Producer
"Rare Chicken Rescue" (2008) – Producer

Short Film

 "The Anthesis of Man (2017) - Producer
"Ascension" (2007) – Producer
"White Song" (2006) – Supervising Producer
"Butterflies in Glass" (2006) – Supervising Producer
"The Truckdriver's Wife" (2006) – Supervising Producer
"Sleeping Awake" (2006) – Supervising Producer
"Road Kill" (2005) – Co-Producer
"Hole in the Wall" (2005) – Producer
"Security" (2005) – Producer
"The Kangaroo" (2004) – Producer
"Faithless" (2004) – Producer
"Doing the Flowers" (2003) – Executive Producer
"Plonk" (2003) – Executive Producer
"Brawn" (2003) – Executive Producer
"Other People" (2001) – Producer
"Bad Ass Mono-Winged Angel" (2000) – Producer

AwardsTwo Heads Creek'''
Audience Award - Syracuse Film Festival, NY, USA (2019)

Rare Chicken Rescue

Winner, Best Documentary – Sydney Film Festival Dendy Awards (2008)
Winner, Grand Jury Award for Best Documentary Short – Slamdance Film Festival, Utah, USA (2009)
Nominated 5 AFI Awards – Best Film, Best Sound, Best Director, Best DOP, Best Editing (Australian Film Institute Awards) (2008)
Winner, Best Sound in a Documentary, Australian Film Institute Awards (2008)
Winner, Best Short Documentary Under 60 Minutes, Film Critics Circle of Australia Awards (2008)
Nominated Inside Film Awards Best Documentary (2008)
Nominated ATOM Awards (Best Documentary Human Story & Best Documentary Short) (2008)
Nominated Best Documentary Wildscreen Festival UK International People and Animal Award (2008)
Finalist, Public Awards, Pacific International Documentary Film Festival (FIFO)
Finalist, Official Short Film Competition, Cinequest Film Festival (USA)
Winner Silver ACS (Australian Cinematography Awards) (2008)

Roller Derby Dolls
Nominated Best Producer at the Women's Image Network USA (2008)
Nominated Best Documentary Short ATOM Awards (2008)

Over My Dead Body

Winner Prix du Jury – SCIENMA Festival of Science (2008)
Nominated Best Science Technology & Environment Awards ATOM (2008)

The Anthesis of Man
 Winner Best Dark Comedy Film Festival, Austin Comedy Film Festival (2017)
 INDIEFEST Award of Excellence Special Mention: Short Film (2017)
 4th place International Horror Film Festival (2017)
 Nominated "Best Screenplay - Lauren Ford" - St Kilda Short Film Festival (2017)
 Nominated "Best Comedy Film" - St Kilda Short Film Festival (2017)
 Nominated "Best Comedy Short Film" - Austin Comedy Short Film Festival (2017)
 Nominated "Best Original Music" - Austin Comedy Short Film Festival (2017)
 Nominated "Best Cinematography" - Austin Comedy Short Film Festival (2017)* Nominated "Best Male Actor" - Austin Comedy Short Film Festival (2017)

Ascension
Honorary Mention by the Jury – Icon Fantastic Film Festival Israel (2008)
Best Film – Tri City Independent Fan Film Festival USA (2008)
Best Aussie Film – Dereel Independent Film Festival (2008)
Best Film – Sci Fi Film Festival (2008)
Best Comedy – Casino Surf & Turf Film Festival (2008)
Best Open Film – Brisbane International Film Festival Queensland New Filmmakers Awards (2007)
Best Script – In the Bin Film Festival (2007)
Bronze Short Film Award – Cinematography Society of Australia NSW Awards (2007)

Hole in the Wall

Best Screenplay – Queensland Shorts Film Festival (2006)
Best Male Actor – Queensland Shorts Film Festival (2006)

Other People

 WINNER- Key West IndieFest Artistic Achievement in Short Film - USA April(2003) 
 WINNER- Best Independent Short Film - The Education Channel's Ninth Annual Independent Film Festival, Tampa USA July (2002)
 WINNER -Cinematography Award - Alternative Film Festival Italy (2002 )
Best Independent Film – Key West IndieFest (2001)
Best Cinematography – Alternative Film Festival (2001)
Best Independent Short – Dahlonega Int Film Festival (2001)

Bad Ass Mono-Winged Angel

 Finalist Best Fiction Under 15 mins Dendy Awards Sydney International Film Festival (2001)
 Finalist 15th Qld New Filmmakers Awards for Best Producer (2001)
 Special Jury Prize – Alternative Film Festival (2000)

References

External links
Vizpoets Entertainment

Australian film producers
Living people
Year of birth missing (living people)
Queensland School of Film and Television alumni